Jacob Sandgren (born 1973) is a Swedish politician and former member of the Riksdag, the national legislature. A member of the Social Democratic Party, he represented Södermanland County briefly in May 2018.

References

1973 births
Living people
Members of the Riksdag 2014–2018
Members of the Riksdag from the Social Democrats